Keating is an unincorporated community in Baker County, in the U.S. state of Oregon.  Keating lies off Keating Road north of its interchange with Oregon Route 86. Keating is northeast of Baker City.

The community was named for an early settler named "Uncle Tom" Keating, a former British sailor who acquired land at this location. A post office operated here from 1880 to 1975.

References

Unincorporated communities in Baker County, Oregon
Unincorporated communities in Oregon